Sergeyevka is a rural locality (a village) in Narodnenskoye Rural Settlement, Ternovsky District, Voronezh Oblast, Russia. The population was 76 as of 2010. There are 3 streets.

Geography 
It is located on the right bank of the Karachan River, 10 km southeast of Ternovka.

References 

Rural localities in Ternovsky District